Jake Graf is an English actor, screenwriter, director, and transgender rights activist. Graf specializes in short films dealing with transgender issues in an effort to normalize queer and trans experiences to a wider, more mainstream audience. Many of Graf's films emphasize the daily lived experiences of trans men.

Career 
Graf's first work within the industry was a screenplay dealing with his experiences as a trans man in making a female-to-male transition. In 2015, Graf visited the White House to take part in a Q&A and viewing of the film The Danish Girl with U.S. president Barack Obama. That year, he became the first trans man to appear on the cover of QX magazine and, in the following year, was featured on the covers of GNI, LGBT Weekly, and FTM Magazine. In 2015, Graf was one of 101 people nominated for a Rainbow Award, which recognizes prominent LGBT+ people in Britain. The nomination acknowledges Graf's work in raising awareness of trans and queer issues through film. Alongside nominations for his work, Jake Graf has been included in judge positions for festivals and award ceremonies. In 2019, Graf took a chair in the Iris Prize Jury, an LGBTQ+ Film Festival. Three years later, Graf also became a judge in the 2022 National Diversity Awards.

Personal life 
From the young age of two, Graf knew that he was different from other kids. As a young child he was very vocal about his feelings and tried telling anyone who would listen that he was a boy. Graf spent much of his youth "trying my best just to ‘pass' as male" He has repeatedly talked about the importance of LGBTQ+ representation in the media. Graf believed he "was the only person in the world that felt like he did" and did not know trans men existed until he was nearly 16. This lack of representation that he experienced as a young person made him feel "lonely and isolated". He decided to start transitioning in 2008 at the age of 28. With the emotional and financial support of his mother, Graf started hormone treatment.

Graf is married to Hannah Winterbourne. The couple went on their date on 30 December 2015 after being introduced by a mutual friend. After three years of dating and receiving Hannah's father's blessing, Graf proposed in New York in September 2017. Their wedding took place on 23 March 2018 at Chelsea Old Town Hall in London. Approximately six years after starting transitioning, Graf decided to have his eggs frozen so that he would have the opportunity of having children in the future. In April 2020, their daughter Millie was born via surrogate. Two years later, the couple announced the birth of their second child on 1 June 2022.

Filmography

Film

Television

Awards and Nominations

See also
 List of transgender film and television directors

External links

References

Year of birth missing (living people)
Living people
Transgender men
English film directors
LGBT film directors
Transgender writers
21st-century English male actors
21st-century English writers
English LGBT writers
English male screenwriters
British LGBT screenwriters
English LGBT rights activists
Transgender rights activists
21st-century British screenwriters
21st-century English male writers